Guémené-sur-Scorff is a commune in the Morbihan department in Brittany  in north-western France. Inhabitants of Guémené-sur-Scorff are called Guémenois.

Geography
Guémené is situated on the Scorff river and is unusual in that it is a commune without any outlying land and it is bounded by the town boundaries only.

Sights
The town is surrounded by wooded hillsides and was the seat of the Dukes of Rohan from the 13th to 15th century. The old castle was destroyed in the building of new houses and many townhouses contain parts of chimney breasts, turret stones and gateway posts. The most impressive sight is the 14th century Porterie - the entrance to what was the old castle.

An important market town, Guémené is valued for its ancient buildings that make up the town center and careful renovation of the same.

One of Brittany's oldest taverns, Les Trois Marchands, has been serving customers since the mid 17th century.

Galery

Old houses

See also
Communes of the Morbihan department
Gaston-Auguste Schweitzer Sculptor of Guémené-sur-Scorff war memorial

References

External links

Official site 
 Non official and nice site 

 Mayors of Morbihan Association 

Communes of Morbihan